Cécile Vermette (born January 19, 1945) is a former nurse and political figure in Quebec. She represented Marie-Victorin in the Quebec National Assembly from 1985 to 2007 as a member of the Parti Québécois.

She was born in Montreal, the daughter of Antonio Vermette and Doria Dubeau, and was educated at the Collège Régina Assumpta, the Hôpital Saint-Luc and the Université de Montréal. She served as government whip  from 1994 to 1996 and was deputy government leader from 2002 to 2003. Vermette retired from politics in 2007.

References 
 

Parti Québécois MNAs
1945 births
Living people
Women MNAs in Quebec
21st-century Canadian politicians
21st-century Canadian women politicians